During the 2015–16 season Vitesse Arnhem participated in the Dutch Eredivisie, in the KNVB Cup and the UEFA Europa League.

Players

Squad details

Transfers

In

Total spending:  €300,000

Out

Total gaining:  €8,000,000

Balance
Total:  €7,700,000

Competition

Friendlies

Pre-season

Overview

{| class="wikitable" style="text-align: center"
|-
!rowspan=2|Competition
!colspan=8|Record
|-
!
!
!
!
!
!
!
!
|-
| Eredivisie 

|-
| KNVB Cup

|-
| Europa League

|-
! Total

Eredivisie

League table

Results

KNVB Cup

Europa League

Third qualifying round

Statistics

Appearances

Top scorers
The list is sorted by shirt number when total goals are equal.

References

External links
Vitesse Official Website 
UEFA Website

Dutch football clubs 2015–16 season
SBV Vitesse seasons